Indiana Transmission is a Stellantis North America automobile factory in Kokomo, Indiana.  The first plant, Indiana Transmission I, opened in 1998 and the second opened in 2003. In June 2010 Chrysler announced a 300 million dollar investment to retool and modernize the Indiana plant for production of a future eight-speed automatic transmission.

Current products:
 Indiana Transmission I
 Chrysler 65RFE transmission RWD
 Jeep Grand Cherokee
 Dodge Durango
 Dodge Ram 1500
 Chrysler 66RFE transmission RWD
 Dodge Ram 2500-3500 (5.7L V8)
 Chrysler 68RFE transmission RWD
 Dodge Ram 2500-3500 (6.7L diesel)
 948TE FWD
 Jeep Cherokee
 Indiana Transmission II
 Chrysler W5A580 transmission RWD 
6 gen. Charger or 2nd Gen. Magnum SXT
Gearbox: Daimler-Benz 5G-Tronic cross Ref. Kelly Bluebook Detailed spec's.
 Chrysler 300
 Dodge Challenger
 Dodge Charger (LX)
 Jeep Grand Cherokee

References

External links
 

Chrysler factories
Motor vehicle assembly plants in Indiana